La Aguada y Costa Azul is a village in the Rocha Department of southeastern Uruguay.

Geography
The village is located on the Atlantic coast and shares borders with La Paloma to the south (the border being the railroad track Rocha - La Paloma) and Arachania to the north.

History
Its status was elevated to "Pueblo" (village) on 21 December 1995 by the Act of Ley Nº 12.253.

Population
In 2011 La Aguada y Costa Azul had a population of 1,090.
 
Source: Instituto Nacional de Estadística de Uruguay

References

External links
INE map of La Paloma, La Aguada y Costa Azul and Arachania

Populated places in the Rocha Department
Seaside resorts in Uruguay